This list of ecoregions in Oregon provides an overview of ecoregions in the U.S. state of Oregon designated by the U.S. Environmental Protection Agency (EPA) and the Commission for Environmental Cooperation (CEC). The Commission's 1997 report, Ecological Regions of North America, provides a spatial framework that may be used by government agencies, non-governmental organizations, and academic researchers as a basis for risk analysis, resource management, and environmental study of the continent's ecosystems. Ecoregions may be identified by similarities in geology, physiography, vegetation, climate, soils, land use, wildlife distributions, and hydrology.

The classification system has four levels. Levels I, III, and IV are shown on this list. Level I divides North America into 15 ecoregions; of these, 3 are present in Oregon. Level III subdivides the continent into 182 ecoregions; of these, 9 lay partly within Oregon's borders. Level IV is a further subdivision of Level III ecoregions. There are 65 Level IV ecoregions in Oregon, many of which continue into adjacent areas in the neighboring states of Washington, Idaho, Nevada, and California. The task of defining and mapping these ecoregions was carried out by the Oregon Ecoregion Project, a collaborative effort involving the EPA, the United States Geological Survey (USGS), the United States Forest Service (USFS), and other state and federal agencies. The new classification system they developed may differ from previous frameworks developed separately by the agencies.

Oregon is ecologically diverse. The west side of the state has a marine-influenced climate and receives plentiful precipitation three seasons of the year. In contrast, Eastern Oregon lies in the rain shadow of the Cascades and is much drier. The climatic gradient is evident in the state's landscapes: forested mountains, glaciated peaks, shrub- and grass-covered plains, agricultural valleys, beaches, desert playas, and wetlands.

Marine West Coast Forest

1 Coast Range
1a Coastal Lowlands
1b Coastal Uplands
1d Volcanics
1f Willapa Hills
1g Mid-Coastal Sedimentary
1h Southern Oregon Coastal Mountains
1i Redwood Zone

3 Willamette Valley 
3a Portland/Vancouver Basin
3b Willamette River and Tributaries Gallery Forest
3c Prairie Terraces
3d Valley Foothills

Northwest Forested Mountains

4 Cascades
4a Western Cascades Lowlands and Valleys
4b Western Cascades Montane Highlands
4c Cascade Crest Montane Forest
4d Cascade Subalpine/Alpine
4e High Southern Cascades Montane Forest
4f Southern Cascades

9 Eastern Cascades Slopes and Foothills
9b Grand Fir Mixed Forest
9c Oak/Conifer Foothills
9d Ponderosa Pine/Bitterbrush Woodland
9e Pumice Plateau
9f Pumice Plateau Basins
9g Klamath/Goose Lake Basins
9h Fremont Pine/Fir Forest
9i Southern Cascades Slope
9j Klamath Juniper Woodland

11 Blue Mountains
11a John Day/Clarno Uplands
11b John Day/Clarno Highlands
11c Maritime-Influenced Zone
11d Melange
11e Wallowas/Seven Devils Mountains
11f Canyons and Dissected Highlands
11g Canyons and Dissected Uplands
11h Continental Zone Highlands
11i Continental Zone Foothills
11k Blue Mountain Basins
11l Mesic Forest Zone
11m Subalpine–Alpine Zone
11n Deschutes River Valley
11o Cold Basins

78 Klamath Mountains
78a Rogue/Illinois Valleys
78b Oak Savanna Foothills
78c Umpqua Interior Foothills
78d Serpentine Siskiyous
78e Inland Siskiyous
78f Coastal Siskiyous
78g Klamath River Ridges

North American Deserts

10 Columbia Plateau
10c Umatilla Plateau
10e Pleistocene Lake Basins
10g Yakima Folds
10i Deep Loess Foothills
10k Deschutes/John Day Canyons
10n Umatilla Dissected Uplands

12 Snake River Plain
12a Treasure Valley
12j Unwooded Alkaline Foothills

80 Northern Basin and Range
80a Dissected High Lava Plateau
80d Pluvial Lake Basins
80e High Desert Wetlands
80f Owyhee Uplands and Canyons
80g High Lava Plains
80j Semiarid Uplands
80k Partly Forested Mountains
80l Salt Shrub Valleys
80m Barren Playas

References

Ecoregions of the United States
 
 
Oregon